Polferries is the largest Polish ferry operator.
The Polish Baltic Shipping Company was established on 31 January 1976 as a state-owned shipping company. Under the operating name Polferries, the company runs ferry routes across the Baltic Sea between Poland and Scandinavia.

In 1996 Polferries approved quality assurance system the International Safety Management Code (ISM). In May 1997 the company was recognised as meeting the requirements of the Quality Management Certificate ISO 9002. It became legally recognised as a corporate body in 1992.

Until 2001, Polferries had owned two ferry terminals in Poland, the Ferry Terminal in Gdańsk and the Ferry Terminal in Świnoujście. Today, the company runs the Ferry Terminal in Gdańsk.

Fleet

Current fleet
 Baltivia - Świnoujście-Ystad
 Wawel - Gdańsk-Nynashamn (Stockholm)
 Mazovia - Ystad-Świnoujście
 Cracovia - formerly Drujba, bought in March 2017, Świnoujście-Ystad
 Nova Star - Gdansk - Nynäshamn (Stockholm)

Future Fleet and Future Arrangements

2 ferries ordered in Szczecin Shipyard

Former fleet
 HSC Boomerang (built in Australia, 1997) — 1997–2001 — now Tallink AutoExpress Two with Conferry.
 MF Drottningen (built in Sweden in 1968) — 1975–1976 — scrapped in China in 2005.
 MF Gute (built in Sweden, 1979) — 2000 — laid up.
 MF Kahleberg (built in Germany, 1983) — 2003–2004 — now RG 1 with RG Line - scrapped.
 MF Lancut (built in Germany, 1967) — 1985–1994 — scrapped in India in 2003.
 MF Nieborow (built in Germany, 1973) — 1988–2002 — now Sveti Stefan II with Montenegro Lines - scrapped.
 MF Parsęta (built in Germany, 1970) — 1991–1997 — scrapped.
 MF Silesia (built in Poland, 1979) — 1979–2005 — now Galaxy with European Seaways.
 MF Wawel (built in Germany, 1965) — 1973–1988 — scrapped in Turkey in 2004.
 MS Pomerania (built in Poland, 1978) — 1978–2010 — later Dalmatia with Blue Line International — scrapped in India in 2014.
 MS Rogalin (built in France, 1972) — 1978–1987, 1989–1991, 1992–2003 — scrapped in India in 2004.

References

External links 

 

Ferry companies of Poland
Ferry companies of Denmark
Ferry companies of Sweden
Transport companies established in 1976
1976 establishments in Poland
Polish brands
DFDS